Bagar, India may refer to:
 Bagar, Jhunjhunu, village in Rajasthan
 Bagar, Pauri Garhwal, Uttarakhand